

The Biblioteca Augusta (est. 1582) is a public library in Perugia, Italy, founded by . It opened in 1623, housed in the former Palazzo Meniconi on the Piazza Piccola.

References

Bibliography

in English

in Italian
  
 
 

Libraries in Perugia
1582 establishments in Italy
Buildings and structures in Perugia
Libraries established in 1582